WESH (channel 2) is a television station licensed to Daytona Beach, Florida, United States, serving the Orlando area as an affiliate of NBC. It is owned by Hearst Television alongside Clermont-licensed CW affiliate WKCF (channel 18). The stations share studios on North Wymore Road in Eatonville (using a Winter Park address), while WESH's transmitter is located near Christmas, Florida.

WESH formerly served as a default NBC affiliate for the Gainesville market as the station's analog transmitter provided a city-grade off-air signal in Gainesville proper (and also provided Grade B signal coverage in the fringes of the Tampa Bay and Jacksonville markets). However, since January 1, 2009, Gainesville has been served by an in-market affiliate, WNBW (channel 9); although Cox Communications continues to carry WESH on its Gainesville area system.

History
WESH-TV first signed on the air on June 11, 1956. At first, it ran as an independent, but on October 27, 1957, it became an NBC affiliate, and has been with NBC ever since. Businessman W. Wright Esch (for whom the station is named) won the license, but sold it to Perry Publications of Palm Beach just before the station made its debut. The station's original studios were located on Corporation Street in Holly Hill, near Daytona Beach.

As such, it shared the NBC affiliation in Central Florida with primary CBS affiliate WDBO-TV (channel 6, now WKMG-TV). It finally became the market's exclusive NBC affiliate on November 5, 1957, when WDBO-TV relinquished its secondary affiliation with the network. On that day, the station activated a new  transmitter tower in Orange City. The tower was located farther north than the other major Orlando stations' transmitters because of Federal Communications Commission (FCC) rules at the time that required a station's transmitter to be located within  of its city of license. The station's signal was short-spaced to prevent interference with non-commercial educational station WTHS-TV (channel 2, now PBS member station WPBT) in Miami.

Perry sold WESH-TV to Cowles Communications of Des Moines, Iowa, in 1965. Cowles later moved its headquarters to Daytona Beach, and built a satellite studio on Minnesota Avenue in Winter Park. WESH was one of two NBC affiliates that were owned by Cowles Communications; during various points in the company's history, Cowles also owned at least three CBS-affiliated stations and two ABC affiliates (one of the two ABC affiliates, WHTN-TV (now WOWK-TV) in Huntington, West Virginia, was affiliated with CBS and ABC on separate occasions during Cowles ownership; that station has since switched back to CBS). The new tower allowed for WESH to expand its signal coverage into areas such as Lakeland, Gainesville and St. Augustine; the channel 2 signal traveled a very long distance under normal conditions. The 1,000-foot tower was dismantled in the late 1980s.

Cowles exited broadcasting in 1984 and sold two of its stations, WESH and Des Moines' KCCI, to Houston-based H&C Communications, owned by the publishers of the Houston Post, the Hobby family. Under H&C ownership, WESH closed its original Holly Hill studio in 1989, and relocated its operations to a temporary studio facility on Ridgewood Avenue (US 1), near International Speedway Boulevard (US 92) in Daytona Beach, which was eventually sold later, but the station maintains its Volusia County news bureau and a microwave tower at that facility. The station's primary operations then moved to a brand new studio in Winter Park in 1991, located on Wymore Road, alongside Interstate 4, equipped with "Super Doppler 2" atop the STL tower and a helipad. (The studios also currently serve as the graphics hub for all Hearst-owned TV stations.) The Hobbys decided to liquidate H&C in 1992; after an attempt to sell its entire TV station group to Young Broadcasting fell through, the company accepted an offer by Pulitzer Publishing to buy WESH and KCCI for $165 million in 1993. Pulitzer sold its entire broadcasting division, including WESH and KCCI, to Hearst-Argyle Television in 1999.

On May 8, 2006, Hearst-Argyle announced its purchase of then-WB affiliate WKCF (channel 18, now a CW affiliate) from Emmis Communications, as part of Emmis' sale of its television station assets to concentrate on its radio properties. This acquisition was completed on August 31, 2006; resulting in Orlando's third commercial television station duopoly (alongside Cox-owned WFTV and WRDQ, and Fox-owned WOFL and WRBW).

On July 9, 2012, due to a dispute between Hearst Television and Central Florida's largest cable provider, Bright House Networks, WESH was removed from Bright House's Central Florida systems. This was part of a larger dispute between Time Warner Cable and Hearst; Bright House was always affected by carriage disputes involving Time Warner Cable. The station was temporarily replaced with Nexstar Broadcasting Group-owned Wilkes-Barre, Pennsylvania NBC affiliate WBRE-TV (TWC/Bright House opted to replace the Hearst stations with out-of-market signals such as WBRE, as the companies do not have the rights to carry any nearby affiliates of networks whose Hearst-owned affiliates were pulled due to the dispute. The substitution of WBRE in place of WESH lasted until July 19, 2012, when a new carriage deal was reached between Hearst and Time Warner.

News operation
WESH presently broadcasts 41 hours of locally produced newscasts each week (with 6½ hours each weekday, four hours on Saturdays and 4½ hours on Sundays).

WESH was the first station in Orlando to carry an on-site Doppler weather radar system, "SuperDoppler 2", as opposed to relying on data from regional radar sites operated by the National Weather Service; the radar is located atop the tower at the station's Winter Park studio facility. The station also operates a VIPIR 3D radar system, taking advantage of the fact that the radars at Melbourne, Tampa, Jacksonville and Miami can all reach Orlando, in addition to "SuperDoppler 2". WESH also produces a nightly weather forecast segment for its Tampa sister independent station WMOR-TV titled the Bikini Cast.

For over two decades, WESH's newscasts have usually placed second in the market, behind WFTV. However, for most of the time since 2004, WESH's newscasts have traded second and third place with WKMG, while its 4 p.m. newscast continued to trail The Oprah Winfrey Show (which concluded its syndication run in May 2011) on WFTV by a wide margin; this coincided with NBC's ratings struggles that have occurred since 2005. Throughout much of the first half of 2009, WESH's ratings became much more competitive with once-dominant WFTV, especially in the key Adults 25-54 demographic. This was attributed to decreases in viewership on its major station rivals, while ratings for WESH's newscasts remained flat. That mini-resurgence was short-lived, however, as WFTV regained its dominance during the November 2009 sweeps period, while WESH retreated back to third (behind WKMG), except on weeknights. WESH was one of many NBC affiliates across the country that benefitted from the network coverage of the 2010 Winter Olympics during the February sweeps ratings period: Its late-night newscast beat WFTV's by a small margin. Since then WESH has maintained a solid second place in most of its newscasts.

WESH titled its newscasts NewsCenter 2 for most of the 1970s and 1980s until the station re-branded to 2 News in 1991, then NewsChannel 2 in 1996. In 2005, WESH adopted the current WESH 2 News branding and began pronouncing the station's call letters as a word for the first time since the early 1990s (grammatically though, the station's callsign does not spell an actual word). In August 2006, WESH debuted an hour-long 4 p.m. newscast. Shortly after Hearst acquired WKCF, WESH began producing a weekday morning newscast for that station in January 2007; this was eventually followed by the launch of a WESH-produced nightly 10 p.m. newscast on WKCF on August 31, 2009.

On November 1, 2007, WESH became the second television station in Orlando (behind WFTV) and the fourth Hearst-owned station to begin broadcasting its local newscasts in high definition. Along with the switch, the station replaced the mandated "Hearst TV News Music Package" theme by Newsmusic Central (although the chimes of "Where the News Comes First" version of the theme were retained during weather forecasts) with Gari Media Group's "The NBC Collection" (which was used for openings, teases and bumpers beginning in 2005). However, in November 2008, the "Hearst TV News Music Package" (with the de facto "Where the News Comes First" signature) was fully reinstated.

In April 2010, video footage from the station's news helicopter "Chopper 2" began to be broadcast in high-definition (WFTV upgraded video footage from its helicopter "Skywitness 9" to HD two months later). Dave Marsh served as WESH's chief meteorologist for 37 years, until his retirement on July 31, 2006; Marsh was later replaced by Tony Mainolfi on May 3, 2007. On July 18, 2012, WESH became the first Hearst-owned station to unveil a new standardized graphics and music package ("Strive" by inthegroovemusic).

In mid-January 2018, WESH became the first Hearst-owned station to unveil an updated version of its standardized graphics package that is optimized for the full 16:9 letterboxed format.

Notable former on-air staff
 Stuart Scott – sports reporter, later with ESPN (died 2015)

Technical information

Subchannels
The station's ATSC 1.0 channels are carried on the multiplexed digital signal of sister station WKCF:

In 2005, WESH launched a second digital subchannel affiliated with NBC Weather Plus; Weather Plus later shut down on December 1, 2008, with the subchannel's programming switched to the Local AccuWeather Channel. WESH's 2.2 subchannel was later used to carry NBC Daytime and syndicated programming from 9 a.m. to 5 p.m. in the late spring and early summer of 2011, in order to accommodate Casey Anthony trial coverage on WESH's primary channel. The arrangement did not include NBC Sports' weekday coverage of the U.S. Open and Wimbledon, which were instead seen on WKCF. (For WESH's coverage of the George Zimmerman trial two years later, WESH's regular daytime programming was moved to WKCF's second digital subchannel.)  On July 11, 2011, WESH replaced the weather programming on subchannel 2.2 with MeTV.

Analog-to-digital conversion
WESH ended programming on its analog signal, on VHF channel 2, at 9 a.m. on June 12, 2009, as part of the federally mandated transition from analog to digital television. The station's digital signal continued to broadcast on its pre-transition VHF channel 11. Through the use of PSIP, digital television receivers display the station's virtual channel as its former VHF analog channel 2. WESH is the only television station in the Orlando market broadcasting on the VHF band post-transition, as WFTV and WKMG-TV opted to broadcast their digital signals on the UHF dial instead.

ATSC 3.0 lighthouse
The station's digital signal is multiplexed:

Translators

Until 2009, the station operated an analog translator in the Melbourne area, W16AJ (channel 16).

References

External links

ESH
NBC network affiliates
MeTV affiliates
Story Television affiliates
Television channels and stations established in 1956
Hearst Television
1956 establishments in Florida
Low-power television stations in the United States
ATSC 3.0 television stations
Daytona Beach, Florida